Ferdinand Daniš (born 7 January 1929) is a Slovak gymnast. He competed at the 1952 Summer Olympics, the 1956 Summer Olympics and the 1960 Summer Olympics.

References

1929 births
Living people
Slovak male artistic gymnasts
Olympic gymnasts of Czechoslovakia
Gymnasts at the 1952 Summer Olympics
Gymnasts at the 1956 Summer Olympics
Gymnasts at the 1960 Summer Olympics
People from Lučenec
Sportspeople from the Banská Bystrica Region